Esperanza, officially the Municipality of Esperanza (Maguindanaon: Inged nu Ispiransa, Jawi: ايڠايد نو اسڤيرنسا), is a 1st class municipality in the province of Sultan Kudarat, Philippines. According to the 2020 census, it has a population of 74,696 people.

History
"Esperanza" is a Spanish word meaning "hope". It is believed that the first baby born in the first settled area in the wildness of Dulawan was a baby girl whom the early settlers called Esperanza, with the anticipation that with the birth of child, the name alone could inspire the coming in of peace, unity and prosperity to the settlers.

In 1952, a group of Christian settlers established a settlement in Villamor within the then municipal district of Dulawan (presently known as barangay Villamor).

In 1953, motivated by the primary concern for the education of their children, the settlers petitioned the school authorities for a school at Barrio Villamor. And on the opening of that school year, the Villamor Primary School started. In the same year, purok leader Silverio Africa of Purok Esperanza initiated and requested a government survey for the proposed bario site of Esperanza with the expressed approval of Datu Into Saliao. The survey was officially known and identified as TS–310.

When the Cotabato–General Santos City National Highway was constructed. Esperanza became an independent barrio of Dulawan, Cotabato with Silverio Africa as the first "Barrio Lieutenant".

In 1956, Datu Into Saliao, a prominent Datu of the place has distributed lands to the people either by lease, share system and even donation to those close to him. By this philanthropic benevolence, people from all walks of life flocked to his barrio. Residential houses mushroomed around and that was the beginning of the programs of Esperanza.

Upon written petition of the residents, the municipality of Ampatuan was created by virtue of Republic Act No. 2509 which was enacted and approved into law without executive approval on June 21, 1959. Esperanza was created by virtue of President Ferdinand E. Marcos. The place progressed rapidly because of its location and philanthropic act of prominent leader of the place named Datu Into Saliao who welcomed the immigrants to the area.

In 1995, Esperanza suffered losses in agricultural crops, implements, farm animals and houses other properties when Lake Maughan overflowed due to heavy rains.

The municipality of Esperanza was transferred from Cotabato Province to Province of Sultan Kudarat on November 22, 1973, by presidential decree 341 of President Ferdinand E. Marcos.

Geography

Barangays
Esperanza is politically subdivided into 19 barangays.

Climate

Demographics

Economy

Culture

Hinabyog festival

Esperanza celebrated the very first Hinabyog festival in November 2005. The word "Hinabyog" translates to the English word "swayed". This resembles to the idea of a "Bamboo swing" or more likely to be a hammock made in bamboo wood, which are very popular in the place.

Hinabyog festival was celebrated by showing different kinds of Bamboo swing/hammock and showing the importance of it. The celebration is likely to be started by a parade of "Drum and Lyre Corps" from schools all over Esperanza. Parades of hired Kings and Queens of the festival is also entered. And the most important part of the celebration is the Hinabyog Dance competition.

The participants for the competitions must be performed by students from schools around the municipality. The Hinabyog Dance Competition is themed by tribal music and dance steps. It is also being referenced to the Bamboo hammocks which mainly being used as props for the dance. Music comes from a group of drummers which must also come from the school.

Unfortunately, in the first Hinabyog Dance Competition, only two schools have entered. The Notre Dame of Esperanza Inc. (NDEi) and The Esperanza National Highschool (ENHS). ENHS have entered three entries for the competition, while NDEi have only given one. Although the stakes are high for the NDEi entry to win, they still managed to win the competition. The winner of the competition is automatically entered for the "Kalimudan Festival" or "The Festival of All Festivals"  held in Isulan, Sultan Kudarat, to represent Esperanza and to compete against other municipalities. Which luckily, they have managed to win from and beating the 12 other competitors.

Government

List of former chief executives
 Esperidion Limson    - 1971
 Mariano Carumba      - 1978
 Romulo L. Latog, Sr. - 1982
 Roberto E. Examen    - 1986
 Jose A. Dequito      - 1987
 Romulo L. Latog, Sr. - 1988
 Fernando L. Ploteña  - 1995
 Romulo L. Latog, Jr. - 2001
 Helen T. Latog       - 2019
 Charles Ploteña      - present

Education
 Notre Dame of Esperanza Inc.
 Esperanza National High School
 Esperanza Central School
 Notre Dame of Dukay Inc.
 Romulo Latog Sr. Elementary School
 Paitan Elementary School
 Sagasa Elementary School
 New Panay National High School
 New Panay Elementary School
 Guiamalia Elementary School
Daladap Elementary School
Salabaca Elementary School
Salabaca National High School
Magsaysay Elementary School

References

External links
Esperanza Profile at PhilAtlas.com
  Esperanza Profile at the DTI Cities and Municipalities Competitive Index
[ Philippine Standard Geographic Code]
Philippine Census Information
Local Governance Performance Management System

Municipalities of Sultan Kudarat